Ethalia electra is a species of sea snail, a marine gastropod mollusk in the family Trochidae, the top snails.

Distribution
This marine species occurs off South Africa.

References

External links
 To World Register of Marine Species

electra
Gastropods described in 1992